Mexoleon is a genus of antlions in the family Myrmeleontidae. There are at least two described species in Mexoleon.

Species
These two species belong to the genus Mexoleon:
 Mexoleon mixtecus (Stange, 1970)
 Mexoleon papago (Currie, 1899)

References

Further reading

 

Myrmeleontidae
Articles created by Qbugbot
Myrmeleontidae genera